The Singapore Red Cross Youth (RCY) is a uniformed group for primary and secondary school students. It has a membership of about 1500 links (primary school students) and about 2500 cadets (secondary school students) . There are currently 41 link units, 43 cadet units and 10 chapter units. A non-uniformed wing – RCY Chapters & Youth Members are inclusive of the RCY.

History
The Red Cross Youth was formed in 1952, with Raffles Girls' School (Secondary) having its first cadet unit. The Red Cross runs school-based youth programmes and is a Co-Curricular Activity (CCA) recognised by the Ministry of Education as an avenue for Character and Citizenship Education in Singapore schools. The Red Cross Youth has two programmes – one for the Primary School children (Link Programme) and another for Secondary School youths (Cadet Programme). The organisation of youth activities under this approach has produced good results with both the Link units and Cadet Units, enthusiastically pursuing a series of activities ranging from social/recreational to community programmes.

Red Cross Youth Chapters (RCYC or RCY Chapters), previously known as the Red Cross Humanitarian Network (RCHN) was incorporated into Red Cross Youth from 1 July 2011.

Structure
The Singapore Red Cross Youth comes under the command of Singapore Red Cross Society with the following appointments:

The Singapore Red Cross Youth Steering Committee is also organised in a National Headquarters level with the following appointments:

Incentive Badges Scheme
The objective of the Incentive Badge Scheme is to encourage Link and Cadet members to take an interest in subjects outside their normal academic curriculum and to widen their interests by carrying out these activities during training. Such activities may also be organised by their respective Zones. Certain activities are also organised by Red Cross Headquarters.

The different badges are as follows:

Cadet Members

Achievements 

 President's Youth Award
 Director's Award

Proficiency badges 

 First Aid (Bronze, Silver, Gold)
 Youth Ambassadors' Blood Programme (Bronze, Silver, Gold)
 Red Cross Knowledge (Bronze, Silver, Gold)
 Red Cross Service Learning (Bronze, Silver, Gold)
 Disaster Management (Bronze, Silver, Gold)
 Youth Leadership (Bronze, Silver, Gold)
 Service Learning (Bronze, Silver, Gold)

National Education badges 

 Total Defence (Bronze, Silver, Gold)
 National Day Parade
 Singapore Youth Festival
 National Camp
 National Heritage

Fundamental badges 

Foot-Drill

Enrichment badges 

 International Friendship
 Link-Cadet

Link Members

Core Subjects 

 Basic First Aid (Foundation, Formative)
 Basic Red Cross Knowledge (Foundation, Formative)
 Youth Ambassadors' Blood Programme (Foundation, Formative)
 Red Cross Service (Foundation, Formative)

UG Fundamental Subjects 

 Basic Outdoor Activities (Foundation, Formative)
 Basic Foot-Drill (Foundation, Formative)

Achievements 

Director's Award

Non-Core Subjects 

 Environment Education (Foundation, Formative)
 Health Education (Foundation, Formative)
 International Friendship
 Performing Arts (Foundation, Formative)
 Sports Education (Foundation, Formative)

Annual Events
Red Cross Youth hosts a variety of major events, performances, competitions and programmes. The events are as follows:

Uniform

Rank structure

Link Members

Volunteer Instructors (VI) 

Volunteer Instructors (VIs) are usually graduated cadets of various RCY units who wish to continue rendering service to the organisation, at the school and/or headquarter level. Volunteer Instructors are required to undergo the Volunteer Instructors' Programme (VIP) organised by Red Cross Youth Headquarters. Trainees will undergo training to equip them with knowledge and skills to be an instructor in Red Cross Youth. All Instructors are required to obtain the Standard First Aid Certificate. When trainees successfully pass out from VIP, they will be appointed the rank of Assistant Cadet Officer.

Duties of a VI includes:
 Assisting the Youth Officer (YO) in preparing the unit's training work plan.
 Assisting in conducting training and organising of activities within the core curriculum of the RCY.
 Assisting in the organisation of activities for the respective district.
 Providing proper guidance and counselling to cadets and links, as well as to take charge of their welfare.
 Attending meetings at unit committees as a co-opted member to provide advice and expertise.

Awards and recognition

Lanyards 

Lanyard are awarded to cadets with outstanding performance in terms of leadership and/or skills in the following programmes/events. Lanyards are usually worn on the left shoulder as shown above. However, if a cadet attains more than one lanyard, he/she can only wear one.

Long Service Awards 

Long Service Medals & Ribbons are awarded to Red Cross Youth Volunteers as an appreciation for their active contributions in Singapore Red Cross Youth.

  Red Cross Diamond Star (25 Years Medal)
  Red Cross Platinum Star (20 Years Medal)
  Red Cross Gold Star (15 Years Medal)
  Red Cross Silver Star (10 Years Medal)
  Red Cross Bronze Star (5 Years Medal)

Medals are worn on the left side of the uniform, in accordance with the order of precedence. Full-sized medals are worn with the Red Cross Full Uniform. The medals are worn centrally on the left side of the uniform showing the obverse face. The base of the medals should be just above the pocket button. If more than one medal is worn, they are shown full-faced and suspended side by side in precedence order with the highest award placed first from the right (nearer to the heart) of the wearer. If more than 4 medals are worn, the highest award is shown full-faced while the others are overlapped.

Ribbons are worn without the orders, decorations and medals. They are worn immediately above the left chest pocket flap. The latest rewarded ribbon is worn on the wearer's right (nearer to the heart) and in the top row when more than one row is worn. Ribbons are worn to a maximum of three in a row. Ribbons in excess of this number are to be worn centrally above the completed row.

The UnI Channel

To allow the cadets to stay connect with Red Cross Youth and interact with other cadets. In 2009, Red Cross Youth publicity team launched a Facebook group and blog, both named The UnI Channel. The blog provides regular updates on Red Cross-related issues such as works of ICRC and IFRC to provide cadets with additional information pertaining to the work of the Red Cross. Besides factual information about the Red Cross, the blog would also discuss problems regarding unit management, teamwork and youth-related issues. Moderators would also put up photos of recent RCY events that have occurred (like the ones mentioned above). The blog has achieved high readership since its launch in 2009, it has over 623,000 views.

The UnI Channel also include a UnI YouTube Channel and a Facebook account which contains photographs of various events that happen within the Red Cross Youth Spectrum. More recently, they launched Twitter and Instagram accounts to update readers on the Red Cross Red Crescent scene, both locally and internationally. The UnI Channel was further improved and currently in use - rcyouth.com. This serves as a platform for all stakeholders to view and download RCY training materials and relevant information for reference.

School Units

Schools are categorised into 4 zones. Below are the zones and their respective schools.

List of RCY Chapters in Singapore
National University of Singapore
Nanyang Technological University
Singapore Management University
Ngee Ann Polytechnic
Nanyang Polytechnic
Singapore Polytechnic
Anderson Junior College
Raffles Institution
Nanyang Junior College
ITE College East
Singapore American School

Notes

References

1952 establishments in Singapore
International Red Cross and Red Crescent Movement
Youth organisations based in Singapore